Morpho uraneis  is a Neotropical butterfly. It is found in Brazil (Amazonas, Pará) and Ecuador.

Description
Morpho uraneis is a large butterfly. The forewings have a concave outer edge. The upperside is dark iridescent blue, except for this it is very similar to Morpho eugenia and it has been placed as Morpho eugenia subspecies uraneis.

In 1913, Hans Fruhstorfer wrote: "M. uraneis Bates is an extraordinarily rare species; in addition to the type only three examples seem to be known, which were collected by Dr. Hahnel at Iquitos and Pebas. According to Staudinger uraneis has the upper surface blue with brilliant mother-of-pearl gloss and is larger and broader-winged. Its flight is more regular and not so rapid as that of adonis."

References

Le Moult (E.) & Réal (P.), 1962-1963. Les Morpho d'Amérique du Sud et Centrale, Editions du cabinet entomologique E. Le Moult, Paris.

External links
"Morpho Fabricius, 1807" at Markku Savela's Lepidoptera and Some Other Life Forms
External images of the holotype and other type specimens.

Morpho
Nymphalidae of South America
Butterflies described in 1865
Fauna of Brazil
Taxa named by Henry Walter Bates